In a career spanning seven decades, American actress Lauren Bacall achieved success in multiple fields of entertainment, and was recognized with Oscar, Emmy, and Grammy nominations for her work in film, television and music, respectively. Additionally, she was awarded two Tony Awards for her work on Broadway. She was the recipient of numerous honorary awards and accolades, including the Cecil B. DeMille Award, the Kennedy Center Honors, and the Academy Honorary Award.

Major awards

Other Film and Television awards and nominations

American Comedy Awards

César du cinéma

Laurel Awards

National Board of Review

Online Film & Television Association Awards

Online Film & Television Association Awards

San Diego Film Critics Society

Satellite Awards

20/20 Awards

Other Theatre awards and nominations

Drama Desk Awards

Hasty Pudding Theatricals

Sarah Siddons Award

Film Festival Awards

Berlin International Film Festival

Karlovy Vary International Film Festival

Norwegian International Film Festival

Palm Springs International Film Festival

San Sebastián International Film Festival

Stockholm International Film Festival

Other honors

Notes

References

Lists of awards received by American actor